Xenillidae is a family of mites belonging to the order Sarcoptiformes.

Genera:
 Choixenillus Subías, 2016
 Neoxenillus Fujikawa, 2004
 Stenoxenillus Woolley & Higgins, 1966
 Stonyxenillus Woolley & Higgins, 1966
 Xenilloides Pérez-Íñigo & Baggio, 1989
 Xenillus Robineau-Desvoidy, 1839

References

Sarcoptiformes